Michael Allen Inez (born May 14, 1966) is an American rock musician best known for his role as the bassist of Alice in Chains since 1993. He is also recognized for his work with Ozzy Osbourne from 1989–1993. Inez has also been associated with Slash's Snakepit, Black Label Society, Spys4Darwin, and Heart. He is of Filipino descent. Inez has earned seven Grammy Award nominations as a member of Alice in Chains.

Career 
Mike Inez began his career in music by playing guitar and saxophone. Since the late 1980s, his career has consisted of the role of bass guitarist in popular hard rock bands.

Ozzy Osbourne (1989–1993) 
In 1989, more than 50 musicians auditioned for Ozzy Osbourne's group, and Inez, then a member of the local L.A. band Skin on Skin, won the spot of bassist. Within a month, Inez was playing live at a gig with Osbourne at Wembley Stadium.

Inez was an official member of Osbourne's band during their recording of the No More Tears album.  However, Bob Daisley was brought in to record the bass and none of Inez's playing is on the final album.  In the liner notes Inez was credited as "bass and music inspiration," as he had written the riff to the title track in a jam session. Inez also appeared on the 1993 Osbourne live album, Live & Loud.

Alice in Chains (1993–present) 

By January 1993 Inez had moved on to his next project. Alice in Chains bassist Mike Starr had left the group after the release of their album Dirt and Inez replaced him. Inez toured throughout 1993 with Alice in Chains on the strength of the Dirt album. The group also participated in the 1993 Lollapalooza Tour. Alice in Chains' Jar of Flies EP was released in 1994 with Inez on bass. Jar of Flies debuted at #1 on album sales charts, the first EP ever to do so.

Inez recorded with the band for their eponymous 1995 release Alice in Chains, which also debuted at #1. In 1996, Alice in Chains recorded their MTV Unplugged special, the first live performance the group had played together in three years. After their last live performance on July 3, 1996, Alice in Chains went on hiatus. Then in August 1998 Alice in Chains returned to the studio to release the songs "Get Born Again" and "Died". In 1999 the band went on hiatus once again, when rumors of vocalist Layne Staley's drug abuse arose. Alice in Chains officially disbanded on April 20, 2002, after the news of the death of Staley.

Slash's Snakepit (1995) 
In 1995, Inez played with Slash on the Guns N' Roses guitarist's side group, Slash's Snakepit. The group recorded It's Five O'Clock Somewhere although Inez did not play any live shows during the corresponding tour. He also briefly rejoined Ozzy Osbourne's band on the Retirement Sucks tour after Geezer Butler resigned due to the pressures of touring.

Jerry Cantrell and Spys4Darwin (1998) 
In 1997 Inez played with his Alice in Chains bandmate, Jerry Cantrell, on his debut solo album, Boggy Depot. In the following year, Inez played on the bonus track to Black Label Society's debut album Sonic Brew, a reworked heavy metal cover version of the Osbourne track "No More Tears". At around this time, Inez formed the band Spys4Darwin with Sean Kinney, Chris DeGarmo from Queensrÿche, and Vinnie Dombroski from Sponge.  They released the microfish EP, and played radio festivals in the Northwest.

Black Label Society (2001–2004) 
In mid-August 2001, Inez temporarily replaced Black Label Society bassist Steve Gibb, who was sent home in the middle of their Ozzfest tour. In 2003, Black Label Society's Robert Trujillo joined Metallica; Inez replaced him in Black Label Society, joining for a short two-week west coast tour of the United States and a short tour of Japan for their The Blessed Hellride album. A few songs from the Tokyo, Japan show of this tour appear in the bonus features section of their live DVD, Boozed, Broozed & Broken-Boned. In 2004, Inez recorded the track "Crazy or High" with Black Label Society for their studio album release Hangover Music Vol. VI.

Heart (2002–2006) 
Following Layne Staley's death in April 2002, Inez joined Heart and toured with the band from 2002 through 2006. He appears on Heart's 2003 release, Alive in Seattle, a double CD live recording that documents a 2002 concert at Seattle's Paramount Theatre.

Inez also played bass and tambourine on Heart's 2004 album Jupiters Darling.

Alice in Chains reunion (2005–present) 

In 2005, Jerry Cantrell, Inez, and Sean Kinney reunited to perform a benefit concert in Seattle for victims of the tsunami disaster that struck South Asia in 2004. By 2006 Inez, along with the surviving members of Alice in Chains, Jerry Cantrell and Sean Kinney, set out for a world tour with various guest singers to fill in for the late Layne Staley. The main singer for the band's tour was William DuVall. The band was also featured on Decades of Rock: Heart and Friends where they performed "Would?" with Phil Anselmo and "Rooster" with William DuVall. DuVall would go on to be made the permanent singer of the group, which has since released three studio albums with Duvall and toured extensively since 2006.

Guest appearances 
In late 2002, Inez was considered to replace Jason Newsted in Metallica.

At the 2007 VH1 Rock Honors, Alice in Chains performed the tribute to Heart. Inez is the only musician who has been a member of both bands.

Inez was a guest player on "Under the Gun" from Motörhead's 2006 album Kiss of Death.

In early 2008, Inez recorded a "Behind the Player" instructional DVD with the help of John Tempesta. The DVD features lessons of some of Mike's favorite Alice in Chains songs, and a sit down in depth interview.

In 2019, Inez was a guest bass player on Mark Morton's debut solo album Anesthetic.

Personal life 
Inez married his fiancée Sydney Kelly on May 8, 2010, at the estate of Susan Silver, Alice in Chains' manager.

Basses and amps 
According to Bass Player Magazine, Inez uses the following basses:
Warwick Streamer Stage I (x2)
Warwick Alien acoustic bass
Alvarez acoustic bass
Gibson Les Paul bass
Fender Telecaster bass
Fender Precision bass
Warwick Streamer 5-string
Kubicki Factor bass
Spector NS-2
Gibson Thunderbird
They are strung with medium-gauge Dean Markley Blue Steel strings.

Inez uses four Ampeg SVT-2PRO heads, two of them plugged into four 1x18" cabinets for the lows, and the other two plugged into two 8x10" cabinets. In addition, he sends his signal direct to the mixing board with a Tech 21 SansAmp Bass Driver DI.

Discography 

Other appearances

Filmography

References

External links 

 
 
 Mike Inez biography
 Alice in Chains official website

1966 births
Living people
Alice in Chains members
Alternative rock bass guitarists
American alternative rock musicians
American heavy metal bass guitarists
American male bass guitarists
American heavy metal guitarists
American musicians of Filipino descent
American rock saxophonists
American male saxophonists
Grunge musicians
Heart (band) members
Guitarists from California
People from San Fernando, California
Slash's Snakepit members
The Ozzy Osbourne Band members
Alternative metal bass guitarists
20th-century American guitarists
Black Label Society members
21st-century saxophonists
Spys4Darwin members